Church tower may refer to:

The bell tower of a church-building
Steeple (architecture)

See also
Bell-gable